Ywa Zin Model Village  is a village in Khin-U Township in Shwebo District in the Sagaing Division of Burma. The principal village is Ywa Zin.

References

External links
 - map showing the village boundary

Townships of Sagaing Region